Going Down In History is the tenth studio album by country rock band the Waco Brothers, released on February 26, 2016, on Bloodshot Records. It was their first album of new material in over a decade.

Critical reception

Based on 12 critic reviews, Going Down In History has a score of 80 out of 100 on Metacritic, indicating "generally favorable reviews". AllMusic's Mark Deming gave the album 4 out of 5 stars, calling it "short and bittersweet" and "the sound of a great band evolving with the times, even as those times try their soul and conscience."

Track listing

References

2016 albums
Bloodshot Records albums